The Box is an Australian soap opera that ran on ATV-0 from 11 February 1974 until 11 October 1977 and on 0–10 Network affiliates around Australia.

The Box was produced by Crawford Productions who at the time was having great success producing police drama series in Australia. The Box was Crawford's first soap opera, and was launched as a reaction to the enormous success of the rival adult soap opera Number 96.

Synopsis
The Box was a drama set in a fictional Melbourne television station, called UCV Channel 12, and explores the day-to-day working's of the company and the professional and personal lives of the staff who work there. It featured elements that satirised the Australian television industry. 

Characters in the series were said to be modelled on Australian television figures and personalities of the day with central character Sir. Henry Usher modelled on both media mogul Sir Frank Packer and aviator Sir Reginald Ansett, and indeed the tea lady Mrs Hopkins, played by Lois Ramsay was based on the company's own tea lady, many self-referential elements featured. Like Number 96 the series was famous for its adult storylines, frequent nude glimpses, and sexual content. Also like Number 96, it was spun off into a feature film adaptation, The Box.

Storylines
Along with constructing characters modelled on real-life Australian television figures of the day, The Box presented various fictional programs produced by UCV-12 that commented-on real-life Australian programs. Police procedural Manhunt, which was lumbered with a dim and accident-prone lead actor Tony Wild (Ken James), was much like the police series produced by Crawfords at that time. Variety program Big Night Out was an In Melbourne Tonight style production. Later the medical drama Mercy Flight seemed connected to early British series The Flying Doctor (1959). Other programs produced by the station included children's show "Holliday Farm", chat program "Girl Talk", and period drama "Gully Rider".

The initial episodes of The Box emphasised sex, scandal, the political machinations of station personnel, and featured several nude scenes. The first episode showed a sexy young woman named Felicity (played by 20-year-old Helen Hemingway) seduce Big Night Out host Gary Burke (Peter Regan). Felicity then announced she was a 15-year-old schoolgirl, causing the station to try to cover-up the scandal. Scheming bisexual television magazine journalist Vicki Stafford (Judy Nunn) exploited the situation and had Felicity pose for a nude centerfold with Tony Wild. Vicki also kissed Felicity, in Australian TV's first ever lesbian kiss. Felicity was soon revealed to be over 18, and schemed her way into the station to appear on Big Night Out. Vicki later switched to working for the station, producing and presenting chat and news style programs.

The Box also featured an openly gay television producer, the flamboyant Lee Whiteman (Paul Karo), and gossipy tea lady Mrs. Hopkins (Lois Ramsey). Mrs. Hopkins' son Wayne (Bruce Kilpatrick) was released from prison during the show's first year. When he fell in love with Lee, Mrs. Hopkins was forced to accept that her son was a homosexual. Lee also clashed with Gary Burke upon taking over as producer of Big Night Out. Gary continually schemed to retain his position on the show.

A feature film adaptation of The Box produced at the end of the first year of production featured most of the regular series characters but had a stand-alone story. The film emphasised comedy to a greater degree than the series version at that time.
 
The program's second year (1975) increasingly emphasised comedy, much of it focused on Tony Wild. Enid Parker (Jill Forster) arrived as a jolly but frumpish spinster secretary. Enid was perturbed when her glamorous sister, the scheming Emma (also played by Forster), showed up and impersonated her. Lee had a brief relationship with closeted newsreader John Barnett (Donald McDonald). Cheryl Rixon appeared on a recurring basis in 1975–1976 as television starlet Angela O'Malley, and appeared nude in the series several times.

For the 1976 season, Jock Blair returned as the program's producer and announced his plans to refocus the series to emphasise adult drama as it had done in its first year.

Production
Production commenced at the studios of Melbourne's ATV-0 (now ATV-10) in October 1973. The first episode screened on ATV-0 on 11 February 1974 at 9.00pm. The program was initially shot in black and white, before switching to colour production in late 1974.

Initially The Box proved a huge hit, ranking as Australia's second most popular show in 1974. (Number 96 was Australia's highest rating television production that year.)

A feature film adaptation of the series was produced in January 1975 and released later that year. It placed a greater emphasis on comedy than the series at that time, and featured several scenes featuring full frontal nudity. The film's sets were later moved to the television studios to be used in the series. In the show's storyline an office fire in October 1975 explained the change in appearance.

Production of the series was in half-hour episodes for the first two years. In some regions two episodes were aired consecutively in one-hour blocks. Other regions broadcast the serial as five half-hour installments each week, stripped across each weekday evening. Starting with the 1976 season, episodes were compiled in one-hour installments.

In Melbourne episodes screened as two, one-hour episodes each week throughout 1976.

Production on the series ended 1 April 1977 due to declining ratings and the closing episodes screened through 1977 in a late-night timeslot. The final episode was broadcast in Melbourne 11 October 1977.

Main cast
Original cast:

Later cast additions included: 

Deborra-Lee Furness appeared as a recurring one-line extra in episodes produced in late 1974.

Judy Nunn, Barrie Barkla, Ken James, Ken Snodgrass and Lois Ramsay appeared throughout the series' entire run.  Barrie Barkla actually worked at a TV station (CTC-7 in Canberra) before moving to Melbourne to play his role as the station manager in The Box. After The Box finished up, Barkla moved to Perth where he worked as a presenter for the Nine Network station STW-9

Peter Regan, who played the part of TV host Gary Burke, went on to become host of ABC's Quest variety series in 1976–78.

Scriptwriters
Key writers for the early episodes included Tom Hegarty, Don Battye and Jonathan Dawson.

Awards
George Mallaby won the Best Australian Actor-National Logie Award in 1975 for his portrayal of television executive Paul Donovan in The Box.

Paul Karo won the Best Australian Actor-National Logie Award in 1976 for his portrayal of gay producer Lee Whiteman.

Feature film
A 1975 feature film, The Box, was produced based on the series, and featuring much of the same cast. The film also features Graham Kennedy playing himself, and Cornelia Frances in the key role of Dr. S. M. Winter, an efficiency expert brought in to improve operations at UCV-12.

DVD releases

In late 2014 Volume 1 of The Box, featuring a selection of episodes from the first year, was released by Crawford Productions. In 2015 Volume 2, which features another selection of episodes from the first year of the series, was released. The releases are described as containing a "selection" of episodes due to a small number of episodes that are excluded as the original tapes were missing or damaged. Each release contains the equivalent of 50 thirty-minute episodes (the first episode is feature length). From the first DVD of 50 episodes, six are excluded as they were missing or damaged. One episode is missed in volumes 2's run of 50 episodes.

The run of episodes continues in Volume 3 which was released in September 2015. Volume 3 contains 50 episodes and there are no missing episodes in this run. Volume 4 was released in January 2017, also with no missing episodes.

After a six year hiatus, Crawfords have confirmed Volume 5 will be released during the first half of 2023.

See also 
 List of Australian television series

References

External links 
 Crawford Productions
 Aussie Soap Archive: The Box – Overview and review
 
 The Box at the National Film and Sound Archive

Australian television soap operas
Network 10 original programming
Television series about television
Television shows set in Victoria (Australia)
1974 Australian television series debuts
1977 Australian television series endings
Black-and-white Australian television shows
Television series by Crawford Productions
English-language television shows